Eleanor of Lancaster, Countess of Arundel (sometimes called Eleanor Plantagenet; 11 September 1318 – 11 January 1372) was the fifth daughter of Henry, 3rd Earl of Lancaster and Maud Chaworth.

First marriage and issue
Eleanor married first on 6 November 1330 John de Beaumont, 2nd Baron Beaumont (d. 1342), son of Henry Beaumont, 4th Earl of Buchan, 1st Baron Beaumont (c.1288-1340) by his wife Alice Comyn (1289-3 July 1349). He died in a tournament on 14 April 1342. They had one son, born to Eleanor in Ghent whilst serving as lady-in-waiting to Queen Philippa of Hainault:
Henry Beaumont, 3rd Baron Beaumont, (4 April 1340 – 25 July 1369), the first husband of Lady Margaret de Vere (d. 15 June 1398), the daughter of John de Vere, 7th Earl of Oxford by his wife Maud de Badlesmere. Henry and Margaret had one son, John Beaumont, 4th Baron Beaumont KG (1361-1396).

Second marriage
On 5 February 1345 at Ditton Church, Stoke Poges, Buckinghamshire, she married Richard FitzAlan, 3rd Earl of Arundel.

His previous marriage, to Isabel le Despenser, had taken place when they were children. It was annulled by Papal mandate as she, since her father's attainder and execution, had ceased to be of any importance to him. Pope Clement VI obligingly annulled the marriage, bastardized the issue, and provided a dispensation for his second marriage to the woman with whom he had been living in adultery (the dispensation, dated 4 March 1345, was required because his first and second wives were first cousins).

The children of Eleanor's second marriage were:

Richard (1346–1397), who succeeded as Earl of Arundel
John Fitzalan (bef 1349 - 1379)
Thomas Arundel, Archbishop of Canterbury (c. 1353 - 19 February 1413)
Lady Joan FitzAlan (1347/1348 - 7 April 1419), married Humphrey de Bohun, 7th Earl of Hereford
Lady Alice FitzAlan (1350 - 17 March 1416), married Thomas Holland, 2nd Earl of Kent (Thomas Holand)
Lady Mary FitzAlan (died 29 August 1396), married John Le Strange, 4th Lord Strange of Blackmere, by whom she had issue
Lady Eleanor FitzAlan (1348 - d 29 Aug 1396) married Sir Anthony Browne.

Later life

Eleanor died at Arundel and was buried at Lewes Priory in Lewes, East Sussex, England. Her husband survived her by four years, and was buried beside her; in his will Richard requests to be buried "near to the tomb of Eleanor de Lancaster, my wife; and I desire that my tomb be no higher than hers, that no men at arms, horses, hearse, or other pomp, be used at my funeral, but only five torches...as was about the corpse of my wife, be allowed."

The memorial effigies raised to Eleanor and her husband Richard Fitzalan, 10th Earl of Arundel, now in Chichester Cathedral, are the subject of the celebrated Philip Larkin poem "An Arundel Tomb."

Ancestry

Sources
Fowler, Kenneth. The King's Lieutenant, 1969
Nicolas, Nicholas Harris. Testamenta Vetusta, 1826.
Weis, Frederick Lewis, Ancestral Roots of Certain American Colonists Who Came to America Before 1700, Lines: 17-30, 21-30, 28-33, 97-33, 114-31

Notes

1318 births
1372 deaths
House of Plantagenet
Burials at Lewes Priory
House of Brienne
FitzAlan family
14th-century English women
14th-century English people
Arundel
Daughters of British earls